Ignatyevo Airport  is an international airport in Amur Oblast, Russia, located near the village of Ignatyevo  north-west of Blagoveshchensk. The large airport services up to medium-sized airliners with parking space for 44 civilian aircraft, and conducts 24-hour flight operation. Ignatyevo Airport is state-owned by Amur Oblast and jointly operated with the Russian Air Force, with a military pad on the north-west side of the airport.

History
The construction of Ignatyevo Airport began in 1959 next to the village of Ignatyevo, after which the airport is named. The first terminal was made of wood and was located approximately on the spot where the current terminal stands. During the early 1990s the airport's activity declined as the new emerging Russian state was suffering from economic decline following the dissolution of the Soviet Union.

In July 1997, the Governor of Amur Oblast signed a decree on the establishment of Airport Blagoveshchensk, a unitary enterprise fully owned by the government of Amur Oblast to own and operate Ignatiyevo Airport. In the 2000s, a partial reconstruction of the airport began in order to increase the volume of transportation and improve the quality of passenger service. In 2007, plans for the construction of a new terminal was resumed after being halted in 1988, and was commissioned in December 2010.

Airlines and destinations

Accidents
On 8 August 2011, IrAero Flight 103, operated by Antonov An-24 RA-46561 overran the runway on landing. Of the five crew and 31 passengers on board, twelve people were injured.

References

External links

 Blagoveshchensk Airport official website

 Airport Blagoveshchensk Aviateka.Handbook

Russian Air Force bases
Soviet Air Force bases
Airports built in the Soviet Union
Airports in Amur Oblast